Operário may refer to:

Football clubs

in Brazil
Operário Futebol Clube (MS) - from Campo Grande, Mato Grosso do Sul.
Operário Futebol Clube (Várzea Grande) - from Várzea Grande, Mato Grosso.
Operário Ferroviário Esporte Clube - from Ponta Grossa, Paraná.
Operário Atlético Clube - from Dourados, Mato Grosso do Sul.
Operário Esporte Clube - from Manacapuru, Amazonas.
Sociedade Esportiva e Recreativa Operários Mafrenses - from Joinville, Santa Catarina.
Novoperário Futebol Clube - from Campo Grande, Mato Grosso do Sul.

in Portugal
CD Operário - from Lagoa, Azores.
Clube Desportivo Operário Meiaviense - from Torres Novas, Santarém

in São Tomé and Príncipe
GD Os Operários - from the island of Príncipe.

Other
Portuguese term for proletarian.